This page lists Japan-related articles with romanized titles beginning with the letter B. For names of people, please list by surname (i.e., "Tarō Yamada" should be listed under "Y", not "T"). Please also ignore particles (e.g. "a", "an", "the") when listing articles (i.e., "A City with No People" should be listed under "City").

B
B'z

Ba
Baby and Me
Babymetal
Babymetal (album)
Baby, The Stars Shine Bright
Badi (magazine)
Badtz-maru
Bahamut Lagoon
Baka (fool)
Bake-danuki
Baku (spirit)
Bakuryuuha
Bakusho Mondai
Balrog (video game character)
Bandai
Band-Maid
Bangai-O
Banjo-Kazooie
Banjo-Tooie
Bank of Japan
Barazoku
Burdock
Baseball Stars
Battle of Anegawa
Battle Angel Alita
Battle of Iwo Jima
Battle of Khalkhin Gol
Battle of Leyte Gulf
Battle of Midway
Battle of Mikatagahara
Battle of Mimasetoge
Battle of Nagakute
Battle of Nagashino
Battle of Okehazama
Battle of Okinawa
Battle of Peleliu
Battle of Sekigahara
Battle of the Coral Sea
Battle of the Java Sea
Battle of the Planets
Battle of Shizugatake
Battle of Tedorigawa
Battle of the Eastern Solomons
Battle of Tsushima
Battle of Uchidehama
Battle of Yalu River (1894)
Battle of Yalu River (1904)
Battle Royale
Battles of Bunroku and Keicho
Battles of Kawanakajima
Batto-jutsu

Be
Bean jam
Beatmania
Beautiful Dreamer (film)
Beautiful Life (Japanese TV series)
BEE Japan
Christopher Belton
Bento
Benzaiten
Beppu, Ōita
Berserk
Betamax

Bi
The Big O
Big the Cat
Bingo Province
Bibai
Bisai
Bisei, Okayama
Bishōnen
Bishōjo
Bitchū Province
Bitchu, Okayama
Biwa, Shiga
Bizen Province
Bizen, Okayama

Bl
Black Cat (manga)
Black Rain
The Black Ships
Black Thunder (chocolate bar)
Blackjack (manga)
Blazing Transfer Student
Blood: The Last Vampire
Blue (2001 film)
Blue Gender

Bo
Bō
BoA
Bob Sapp
Bōgu
Bōjutsu
Bokeh
Bokken
Bokkun
Bombardment of Shimonoseki
Bombing of Tokyo in World War II
Bon Festival
Bon Odori
Bones (studio)
Bonotsu, Kagoshima
Bonsai
Boogiepop series
Boogiepop Phantom
The Book of Five Rings
The Boom
Bōryokudan
Boshin War
Bōsōzoku
Botchan
Bow-Lingual
Bowser (Nintendo)
Bowser Jr.
Boys Be

Br
Bra (dragonball)
Branded to Kill
Brand New Maid
Brave Fencer Musashi
Brazilian Jiu Jitsu
Breath of Fire
Bridgestone
Bright Future
Bright Noa
Brown rice
Jules Brunet

Bs
BS The Legend of Zelda
BS Zelda no Densetsu Inishie no Sekiban

Bu
Bubble Bobble
Bubblegum Crash
Bubblegum Crisis
Bubblegum Crisis Tokyo 2040
Buddhahood
Buddhism
Buddhist cuisine
Buddhist terms and concepts
Budō
Bujinkan
Bukkake
Bulma
Bungo Province
Bungotakada, Ōita
Bunkyō, Tokyo
Burakumin
Bushido
Bust-A-Move Bash!
Bust-a-Move DS
Bust-a-Move Millennium
Bust-a-Move Pocket
Bust-a-Move Universe
Buyo
Buzen Province
Buzen, Fukuoka

By
Byōdō-in
Byoyomi

B